Histura luteochlora is a species of moth of the family Tortricidae. It is found in the Federal District of Brazil.

The wingspan is about 15 mm. The ground colour of the forewings of the males is cream, suffused and spotted green. The markings are green with black dots and larger marks. The hindwings are pale brown. The ground colour of the forewings of the females are green, with sparse white dots and somewhat larger black dots.

References

Moths described in 2011
Polyorthini